Waldyr Geraldo Boccardo (alternate spelling: Waldir) (28 January 1936 – 18 November 2018) was a Brazilian basketball player. He was a member of the team that won the title at the 1959 World Championship and the bronze medal at the 1960 Olympics.

Boccardo was born in São Manuel, and died, aged 82, in Rio de Janeiro.

References

External links
 
 
 FIBA Profile
 CBB Profile 

1936 births
2018 deaths
Basketball players at the 1960 Summer Olympics
Brazilian men's basketball players
1959 FIBA World Championship players
CR Vasco da Gama basketball players
Flamengo basketball players
Medalists at the 1960 Summer Olympics
Olympic basketball players of Brazil
Olympic bronze medalists for Brazil
Olympic medalists in basketball
Sportspeople from São Paulo (state)
FIBA World Championship-winning players
People from São Manuel